Below is a list of the largest aluminum-producing companies by output (in 1,000 metric tons), accurate as of 2016 according to Statista.

See also
List of largest manufacturing companies by revenue
List of public corporations by market capitalization
List of largest financial services companies by revenue
List of largest European manufacturing companies by revenue
List of largest companies by revenue

References

External links
statista website

Aluminium
Aluminium
Economy-related lists of superlatives